Judge Innes may refer to:
 James Rose Innes (1855–1942), Chief Justice of the Union of South Africa
 Harry Innes (1752–1816), first United States federal judge in Kentucky